Keith Stewart Thomson (born 1938; B.SC. Birmingham, AM, Ph.D. Harvard) was from 2003 to 2012 a senior research fellow of the American Philosophical Society and is, starting in 2012, the Executive Officer of the American Philosophical Society and is an emeritus professor of natural history at the University of Oxford. He was appointed director of the Oxford University Museum of Natural History in July 1998. In 1987 he was appointed president of the Academy of Natural Sciences in Philadelphia. He had earlier been a dean at Yale University and director of Yale's Peabody Museum of Natural History.
He is the author of several books and essays that deal with paleontology, the history of science and evolution.

Bibliography

References

Living people
Alumni of the University of Birmingham
Charles Darwin biographers
Harvard University alumni
1938 births
Members of the American Philosophical Society